Zee Maharashtra Kusti Dangal (ZMKD)  is a professional wrestling league in India, launched on 2 November 2018 and broadcasting on Zee Talkies. Zee Talkies announced the tournament on 12 January 2018 in Mumbai.

Format 
Currently, with six teams, each team plays each other twice in the league phase. At the conclusion of the league stage, the top four teams will qualify for the semi finals. The winners of the semifinal matches will move onto the final to play the ZMKD final match, where the winner will be crowned the Zee Maharashtra Kusti Dangal champions.

Season 1 
The six teams consist of 3 celebrities and 3 dignitaries from different fields, and tournament matches will be held at the Balewadi Stadium in Pune. The first draft event of players for the 6 teams was held on 19 October 2018 in Mumbai.

Teams 
Following the player draft, the names of the final team and their players were announced at the press conference. Swwapnil Joshi (Vidharbhache Wagh), Sai Tamhankar (Kolhapuri Mavle), Nagraj Manjule (Veer Marathwada), Purshottam Jadhav (Yashwant Satara), Rajesh Dake (Mumbai Astra) and Shantaram Manve & Paritosh Painter (Puneri Ustaad) own six teams in the wrestling tournament.

Prize 
Prize money for the winner of season 1 will be ₹ 50 Lakh. The first and second runners-up will be awarded ₹ 30 lakh and ₹ 20 lakh respectively.

References 

2018 establishments in India
Sports leagues established in 2018
Professional sports leagues in India
Wrestling in India
Wrestling competitions